Pavle Bajčetić (born 21 April 1945) is a Yugoslav judoka. He competed in the men's half-heavyweight event at the 1972 Summer Olympics.

References

1945 births
Living people
Yugoslav male judoka
Olympic judoka of Yugoslavia
Judoka at the 1972 Summer Olympics
Place of birth missing (living people)